Governor Smith may refer to:

In the United States
Al Smith (1873–1944), Governor of New York
Benjamin Smith (North Carolina politician) (1756–1826), Governor of North Carolina
Charles Aurelius Smith (1861–1916), Governor of South Carolina
Charles Manley Smith (1868–1937), Governor of Vermont
Edward Curtis Smith (1854–1935), Governor of Vermont, son of J. Gregory Smith.
Elmo Smith (1909–1968), Governor of Oregon
Forrest Smith (1886–1962), Governor of Missouri
George William Smith (politician) (1762–1811), acting Governor of Virginia
Green Clay Smith (1826–1895), Territorial Governor of Montana
Henry Smith (Texas governor) (1788–1851), Governor of Texas
Henry Smith (Rhode Island governor) (1766–1818), Governor of Rhode Island
Hulett C. Smith (1918–2012), Governor of West Virginia
Israel Smith (1759–1810), Governor of Vermont
J. Gregory Smith (1818–1891), Governor of Vermont
James Milton Smith (1823–1890), Governor of Georgia
James Y. Smith (1809–1876), Governor of Rhode Island
Jeremiah Smith (lawyer) (1759–1842), Governor of New Hampshire
John Smith (explorer) (1580–1631), Colonial Governor of Virginia from 1608 to 1609
John Smith (President of Rhode Island) (died 1663), Governor of Rhode Island
John Butler Smith (1838–1914), Governor of New Hampshire
John Cotton Smith (1765–1845), Governor of Connecticut
John Walter Smith (1845–1925), Governor of Maryland
M. Hoke Smith (1855–1931), Governor of Georgia
Nels H. Smith (1884–1976), Governor of Wyoming
Persifor Frazer Smith (1798–1858), 6th Military Governor of California 
Preston Smith (governor) (1912–2003), Governor of Texas
Robert Burns Smith (1854–1908), Governor of Montana
Roy Campbell Smith (1858–1940), Governor of Guam
Samuel E. Smith (1788–1860), Governor of Maine
Thomas Smith (governor of South Carolina) (1648–1694), Governor of colonial South Carolina from 1693 to 1694
William Smith (Virginia governor) (1797–1887), 30th and 35th Governor of Virginia
William E. Smith (politician) (1824–1883), Governor of Wisconsin
William Hugh Smith (1826–1899), Governor of Alabama
William "Tangier" Smith (1655–1705), Provincial Governor of New York

In other places
Augustus Smith (politician) (1804–1872), Governor of the Isles of Scilly
Cecil Clementi Smith (1840–1916), Governor of the Straits Settlements from 1887 to 1893
Gerard Smith (governor) (1839–1920), Governor of Western Australia
Sir Harry Smith, 1st Baronet (1787–1860), Governor of the Province of Queen Adelaide, and of Cape Colony from 1847 to 1852
Henry Abel Smith (1900–1993), Governor of Queensland
James Francis Smith (1859–1928), Governor-General of the Philippines
John Hilary Smith (born 1928), Governor of the Gilbert and Ellice Islands from 1973 to 1978
John Hope Smith (1780s–1831), Governor of the Committee of Merchants of the Gold Coast from 1817 to 1822
Sir Lionel Smith, 1st Baronet (1778–1842), Governor of Jamaica
Peter Smith (diplomat) (born 1942), Governor of the Cayman Islands from 1999 to 2002
Reginald Dorman-Smith (1899–1977), Governor of Burma
Robert Smith (colonial administrator) (1887–1959), British Governor of North Borneo from 1937 to 1942 and from 1945 to 1946
Thomas Smith (Royal Navy officer) (1707–1762), Governor of Newfoundland in 1741 and 1743

See also
Frederick Smyth (New Hampshire politician) (1819–1899), Governor of New Hampshire
Henry Augustus Smyth (1825–1906), Acting Governor of Cape Colony in 1889 and Governor of Malta from 1890 to 1893
Leicester Smyth (1829–1891), Governor of Gibraltar from 1890 to 1891
Judge Smith (disambiguation)
Justice Smith (disambiguation)
Mayor Smith (disambiguation)
Mister Smith (disambiguation)
President Smith (disambiguation)